Brasilentulus is a genus of proturans in the family Acerentomidae.

Species
 Brasilentulus africanus Tuxen, 1979
 Brasilentulus huetheri Nosek, 1973

References

Protura
Arthropods of Africa